Nathaniel "Nate" Northington (born 1947) was the first African-American to play college football in the Southeastern Conference (SEC). He became the first black scholarship athlete to play in an athletic contest of any kind in the SEC when his University of Kentucky Wildcats opened their 1967 season against Indiana in Bloomington, Indiana on September 23 of that year. One week later, he became the first black scholarship athlete to play in a contest involving two SEC teams when the Wildcats hosted Ole Miss in Lexington, Kentucky.

Northington was a member of Kentucky's 1966 freshman team along with African-American teammate Greg Page. (At the time, freshmen were not allowed to play on NCAA varsity teams). Before the 1967 season, Page became paralyzed after suffering a spinal cord injury during an August practice. Northington was the only Wildcats player allowed by Kentucky athletic officials to visit Page in the hospital.  Page died from his complications 38 days later – on the night before Northington's and Kentucky's game against Ole Miss.

Northington only played three minutes before dislocating his shoulder, and Kentucky would go on to lose 26-13. Immediately after returning from Page's funeral a few days later, Wildcats head coach Charlie Bradshaw put the team through a three-hour practice. Page had been Northington's roommate and pillar of support as they had jointly become the first two African-American men to play on a Kentucky football team. Northington was griefstricken about the loss of his best friend and missed some classes over the ensuing weeks. Five games into the season, his meal ticket revoked by the coach as penalty for missing classes meaning he could no longer eat with his teammates, Northington left the Wildcats team and later transferred to Western Kentucky University.

In 2016, the University of Kentucky unveiled a new statue of Northington, Page, Wilbur Hackett and Houston Hogg in recognition of the first four African-American football players in the SEC.

Footnotes

References

1947 births
Living people
Kentucky Wildcats football players
African-American players of American football
21st-century African-American people
20th-century African-American sportspeople